Pen-y-cae is a village in Powys, Wales in the Brecon Beacons National Park between Abercraf and Craig-y-Nos Castle, in the community of Tawe-Uchaf. The village is mostly a linear settlement along the A4067 which runs approximately parallel to the River Tawe. Pen-y-cae has a school and two pubs, the Pen-y-cae Inn in the centre of the village and the Ancient Briton, close to Ynyswen.

References

Villages in the Brecon Beacons National Park
Villages in Powys